The Murray Formation is the name given to a distinctive mudstone geologic formation studied by the Mars Science Laboratory (MSL) Curiosity at the Gale Crater, Mars.

Stratigraphy
The formation is composed mostly of basaltic minerals plus clays, though an intermediate horizon contains tridymite, cristobalite, quartz and opal.

The Murray formation has five named subunits, i.e. Pahrump Hills Member, Hartmann's Valley Member, Karasburg Member, Sutton Island Member, Vera Rubin Ridge Member. It unconformably underlies the Stimson formation.

References

Geology of Mars